Robert Warren Tully (August 2, 1909 – June 12, 1981) was an American football, basketball, and baseball coach, college athletics administrator, parks and recreation director, and university professor. He was the head football coach at Bethel College in North Newton, Kansas, serving for three seasons, from 1946 to 1948, and compiling a record of 6–18–1.

Tully was born on August 2, 1909, in Goshen, Indiana. There he attended Goshen High School, playing football and basketball and running track. He played football and baseball each for four years at Manchester College—now known as Manchester University—in North Manchester, Indiana before graduating in 1931.

In July 1940, Tully was appointed the director of physical education and athletics at La Verne College—now known as the University of La Verne—in La Verne, California. He was also the head basketball and baseball coach at La Verne and assisted with the football team.

Tully took a leave of absence at Bethel College in 1950 to accept a graduate assistantship at Indiana University Bloomington. He remained at Indiana and was appointed director of the Bradford Woods Camping laboratory and associate professor of recreation and park administration. Tully retired from Indiana University in 1976 and later resided in Lorida, Florida. He died on June 12, 1981, at Indiana University Medical Center in Indianapolis.

Head coaching record

Football

References

External links
 

1909 births
1981 deaths
American football quarterbacks
Baseball catchers
Bethel Threshers athletic directors
Bethel Threshers baseball coaches
Bethel Threshers football coaches
Bethel Threshers men's basketball coaches
Indiana University Bloomington faculty
La Verne Leopards athletic directors
La Verne Leopards baseball coaches
La Verne Leopards football coaches
La Verne Leopards men's basketball coaches
Manchester Spartans baseball players
Manchester Spartans football players
People from Goshen, Indiana
Coaches of American football from Indiana
Players of American football from Indiana
Baseball players from Indiana
Baseball coaches from Indiana
Basketball coaches from Indiana